Diego Rodríguez may refer to:

Politicians
Diego Rodríguez Porcelos (died 885), son and successor of Rodrigo, count of Castile
Diego Rodriguez (Arizona politician), State Representative from Arizona

Sportspeople
Diego Rodríguez (footballer, born 1960), Spanish football defender
Diego Rodríguez (footballer, born 1986), Uruguayan football left-back
Diego Rodríguez (1988–2010), Uruguayan football defender
Diego Rodríguez (footballer, born 1989), Uruguayan football defensive midfielder
Diego Matías Rodríguez (born 1989), Argentine football goalkeeper
Diego Rodríguez (footballer, born 1991), Uruguayan football defender
Diego Rodríguez (footballer, born 1995), Honduran football left-back

Other
Diego Rodríguez (mathematician) (1569–1668), mathematician, astronomer, educator and technological innovator in New Spain
Diego Rodríguez (son of El Cid) (died 1097), died during the Battle of Consuegra

See also
Diogo Rodrigues (died 1577), Portuguese explorer